Julien Rancoule (born 31 July 1993) is a French politician from National Rally (RN) who has represented the 3rd constituency of Aude in the National Assembly since 2022.

References 

Living people
1993 births
Deputies of the 16th National Assembly of the French Fifth Republic
National Rally (France) politicians
21st-century French politicians